Integris Southwest Medical Center is a comprehensive hospital located in southwest Oklahoma City, Oklahoma.

The Integris Cancer Institute of Oklahoma, the Integris Southwest Breast Health and Imaging Center, Integris Jim Thorpe Rehabilitation, the Integris Neuromuscular Center, the Integris M.J. and S. Elizabeth Schwartz Sleep Disorders Center and the Integris James R. Daniel Stroke Center are Integris Health Centers of Excellence on the Integris Southwest hospital campus in Oklahoma City.

Medical services
Breast Health and Imaging Center
Cancer Institute
Cardiology Southwest
Heart Care Center
Hospitalist Program
Integris Southwest Heart Care Center
James R. Daniel Stroke Center of Oklahoma
Jim Thorpe Rehabilitation
Neuromuscular Center
M.J. and S. Elizabeth Schwartz Sleep Disorders Center of Oklahoma
Neuroscience Institute
Pastoral Care
Pharmacy
Pulmonary Medicine
Radiology Services
Surgery Department
Volunteer Services
Women's and Children's Services

History
Integris Southwest Medical Center opened in 1965 as South Community Hospital. The name was changed to Southwest Medical Center of Oklahoma in March 1992, and then became Integris Southwest Medical Center in February 1995.

Integris Southwest Medical Center has grown from a 73-bed community hospital to a comprehensive medical center with more than 400 beds.  Units of the hospital include Integris Cancer Institute of Oklahoma, the Integris Southwest Breast Health and Imaging Center, Integris Jim Thorpe Rehabilitation, the Integris Neuromuscular Center, the Integris M.J. and S. Elizabeth Schwartz Sleep Disorders Center  and the Integris James R. Daniel Stroke Center.

Hospital rating data
The HealthGrades website contains the clinical quality data for Integris Southwest Medical Center, as of 2018. For this rating section clinical quality rating data, patient safety ratings and patient experience ratings are presented.

For inpatient conditions and procedures, there are three possible ratings: worse than expected, as expected, better than expected.  For this hospital the data for this category is:
Worse than expected - 4
As expected - 18
Better than expected - 1

For patient safety ratings the same three possible ratings are used. For this hospital they are"
Worse than expected - 3
As expected - 9
Better than expected - 1

Percentage of patients rating this hospital as a 9 or 10 - 69%
Percentage of patients who on average rank hospitals as a 9 or 10 - 69%

References

Hospital buildings completed in 1965
1965 establishments in Oklahoma
Hospitals in Oklahoma
Buildings and structures in Oklahoma City